IIC University of Technology (IIC) came into existence in 2008 through the evolution of the International Institute of Cambodia, founded in 1999. IIC University is accredited by the Royal Government of Cambodia as specified in Sub-Decree No. 127ANK.BK. It is a member of the International Association of Universities.
.

Academics

Faculties
The university has five faculties.
 Faculty of Commerce
 Faculty of Economics
 Faculty of Mathematics and Science
 Faculty of Social Science
 Faculty of Arts, Humanities and Linguistics

Graduate school
The graduate school of IIC University of Technology consists of five faculties:
 Management & Business Administration
 Social Sciences and Communication
 Engineering
 Pure Science and Medicine
 Computer Science and Information Technology

As a result of the MBA program, consultants with a hands-on approach are produced.

The university offers conventional and industrial PhD programs. Industrial PhD is a qualification to train professionals to solve industry-oriented problems. Conventional PhD focuses on 80% academic needs and 20% industrial needs whereas Industrial PhD is 20% academic needs and 80% industrial needs.

Accreditation and recognition

Domestic 
  Ministry of Education, Youth and Sport (Cambodia)

International 
  International Association of Universities (IAU)

References

Education in Phnom Penh
Universities in Cambodia
Engineering universities and colleges in Cambodia